The Cave of the Silken Web a.k.a. Journey to the West - the Spiders Cave a.k.a. Spiders is a 1927 Chinese film directed by Dan Duyu and starring Yin Mingzhu as the first spider spirit. It is based on an episode of the shenmo fantasy novel Journey to the West, a Chinese literary classic written in the Ming Dynasty.

The ten-reel silent film was produced by Shanghai Yingxi Company.

It was thought to be a lost film, until 2011, when an original copy of The Cave of the Silken Web was discovered in the archives of the National Library in Mo i Rana, Norway. The film was presented at the Films from the South 2013 festival in Oslo. Roughly three-quarters of the film is preserved, the first reel and a section in the middle is lost. The Norwegian copy has retained the original Chinese intertitles, but includes additional jokes in Norwegian written for the local audience.

Cast
 Yin Mingzhu as First Spider Spirit
 Xia Peizhen as Second Spider Spirit
 Wu Wenchao as Sun Wukong
 Jiang Meikang as Tang Sanzang
 Zhou Hongquan as Zhu Bajie
 Dan Erchun as Sha Wujing
 He Rongzhu as Man In White
 Chen Baoqi as Yellow Flower Daoist Spirit

Sequel
The film was followed by a sequel in 1930: The Cave of the Silken Web II a.k.a. Spiders II, also directed by Dan Duyu and starring Yin Mingzhu. The sequel is believed to be a lost film.

See also
 The Cave of the Silken Web (1967 film)
 List of Chinese films before 1930
 List of rediscovered films

References

External links 

 

1927 films
Films based on Journey to the West
1920s rediscovered films
Chinese silent films
Chinese black-and-white films
Rediscovered Chinese films